Urakawa Dam  is a gravity dam located in Hokkaido Prefecture in Japan. The dam is used for flood control. The catchment area of the dam is 18.1 km2. The dam impounds about 60  ha of land when full and can store 5630 thousand cubic meters of water. The construction of the dam was started on 1973 and completed in 1999.

References

Dams in Hokkaido